Flavobacterium xanthum is a species of bacteria.

References

Further reading

Whitman, William B., et al., eds. Bergey's manual® of systematic bacteriology. Vol. 5. Springer, 2012.

External links
LPSN
Type strain of Flavobacterium xanthum at BacDive -  the Bacterial Diversity Metadatabase

xanthumm
Bacteria described in 2000